Thor is an outdoor 1977 copper and redwood sculpture by American artist Melvin Schuler, located on the Transit Mall of downtown Portland, Oregon.

Description and history

Thor is an abstract outdoor sculpture depicting Thor, the hammer-wielding god of thunder in Norse mythology. Located at the intersection of Southwest 6th Avenue and Southwest Taylor Street in the Portland Transit Mall, the copper on redwood sculpture was completed in 1977, funded by TriMet and the United States Department of Transportation. It measures  x  x . According to the Regional Arts & Culture Council, the agency which administers Thor, "This piece served as a excellent example of Schuler's work, which is characterized by large cubic and angular sculptures achieved by hammering copper onto carved redwood. This process creates a unique and recognizable finish to his sculptures." The sculpture was previously located at Southwest 5th between Washington and Alder.

See also
 1977 in art
 Mimir (sculpture) by Keith Jellum (1980), a sculpture in Portland depicting the Norse god Mímir
 Norse mythology in popular culture

References

External links
 Thor, Portland, Oregon at Waymarking.com

1977 establishments in Oregon
1977 sculptures
Abstract sculptures in Oregon
Copper sculptures in Oregon
Outdoor sculptures in Portland, Oregon
Sculptures of gods
Sculptures of Norse mythology
Sculptures on the MAX Green Line
Southwest Portland, Oregon
Thor
Thor in art
Wooden sculptures in Oregon